MacKenzie-Childs, Ltd. is a manufacturer of ceramics and retailer of hand-painted imported furniture and home décor, based in Aurora, New York, and founded in 1983 by Victoria and Richard MacKenzie-Childs.

The company entered Chapter 11 bankruptcy protection in 2000, and in 2001 Pleasant Rowland, founder of American Girl, purchased MacKenzie-Childs, Ltd. In 2005, the company laid off several workers. After Rowland restructured her management team in 2006, MacKenzie-Childs, Ltd. became profitable again.  In 2008 Rowland sold MacKenzie-Childs, Ltd. to Lee Feldman and Howard Cohen, part owners of Twin Lakes Capital.

In 2006, MacKenzie-Childs, Ltd. sued founders Victoria and Richard MacKenzie-Childs citing trademark violation, as their last name and trademarks referencing it had allegedly been sold off in the bankruptcy proceedings.

In 2014, Castanea Partners, a private equity firm, invested in Aurora Brands, the owner of MacKenzie-Childs, Ltd. In 2018 MacKenzie-Childs, Ltd. acquired Patience Brewster Inc. Patience Brewster, an Upstate New York book illustrator and ornament designer, joined the company's creative team, supporting the design and development of products for the Patience Brewster by MacKenzie-Childs collection. 

MacKenzie-Childs, Ltd. is well-known for its annual Barn Sale, which in 2017, drew more than 26,000 shoppers to the company's 65-acre property in Aurora, making the event one of the premier draws for tourists in Cayuga County, New York. Held over four days, the sale draws shoppers from around the globe who come for discounts that range from 40 percent to 80 percent.

References

External links
  Mackenzie-Childs

Companies based in New York (state)